Boy Interrupted is a 2009 documentary filmed by Perry Films.  The film is based on the life of Evan Perry, who experienced bipolar depression from a young age. The documentary was filmed throughout Evan's life, because whenever his parents, Dana and Hart Perry, consulted a psychiatrist about Evan's suicidal comments or other signs of mental illness, the psychiatrists did not believe that their son was depressed.  The footage was originally meant to show the healthcare professionals what was happening in Evan's life and to help them access the treatment Evan needed.

Evan was diagnosed with depression at age 5, and he was later diagnosed with bipolar depression. Despite the treatment and medication received, he died by suicide in 2005 at age 15. Evan Perry had a family medical history involving serious mental illnesses. This documentary mostly focused on how his bipolar depression affected him and those who loved him.

About four years after Evan's death, the documentary was shown at the Sundance Film Festival and released on television and DVD.

Story

Early childhood 
Evan was very loving towards his family and others. At school, he was always the model student, behaving very well and being helpful.  When he was four years old, he started telling his mom that he wanted to kill himself. It shocked her because at that age, she thought kids would not even know what death is, and he did not seem sad when he was talking about dying.  In kindergarten, Evan said he wanted to kill himself in front of the whole class.  The teacher told his parents, and Hart and Dana Perry took him to see a therapist.

In 1995, mental health professionals were uncertain whether young children could be depressed. Dana Perry, a professional filmmaker, knew that psychiatrists would not believe everything she told them about her son. At this point, she decided to film as much as she could from Evan's life, especially when he talked about suicide.

At age 5, Evan Perry was diagnosed with depression, and he was prescribed Prozac. The medication did not seem to be working, but it was their only choice, so they decided to give it time. Evan was very much into filming, just like his parents. At home he would make skits with his brothers and film vacations, and at school he would make plays. Most of his plays were about death.

By the time Evan was 7 years old, he started behaving like a teenager. His responses were really short towards his family, he was listening to Nirvana, he was writing songs about suicide, demons, and pain, and he would lock himself in his room away from everyone. His parents knew this behavior wasn't normal at this age, and they were concerned, but there wasn't much they could do.

Middle childhood 
When Evan was 10 years old he started attending Pk Yonge School and made his first attempt to commit suicide. He was at school and he sneaked off to the roof while everyone was at the playground below. He was standing on the ledge very calmly and one of his teachers was able to get him down from the roof while his parents got there. When his parents picked him up, they went straight to the Four Winds which is a mental institution. There they diagnosed him with Bipolar depression. His whole stay there, Evan kept saying that he simply did it for attention, however they knew it was just his way of getting the attention off of him. Evan was prescribed a dosage of lithium to help with the chemical imbalance in his brain. When Evan was stable enough to leave the institution, his parents sent him to Wellspring which is a home for troubled kids like Evan. At Wellspring he ran away his first night, but eventually he gave in and let himself get help. Evan became a boy again, he was no longer behaving like a broody teenager, he was playing games outside like every other kid would do. His family also went to Wellspring for family therapy, so that they could all learn to communicate and understand Evan. He seemed to be getting better, he seemed healthier and happier so he was taken out of Wellspring and was sent to York prep school.

Adolescence 
At this school Evan became very involved, he made many friends and he would go out and have fun. Evan also got back into filming and he would make productions with his friends. None of his friends could tell that Evan had bipolar depression, the only time they noticed something off was closer to the time when he committed suicide. Many years passed and Evan was doing great at his school, his social life was great and he was very close to his family. When Evan was 15 he asked to be taken off the Lithium, his parents thought it could work if he gradually came off the medication. Little by little they reduced his dosage with the approval of his therapist, at first he seemed to be doing okay, but then his symptoms began to worsen quickly. He didn't want to go out as much anymore, he was behaving differently and his parents decided it'd be best if he went back on the full dosage. They made an appointment with his therapist to alter his lithium dosage. Three days before his appointment, Evan got into an argument with his mom about doing his homework, he locked himself in his room but his dad did go to check on him and saw that he was doing homework. His dad was putting his little brother to sleep and looked into Evan's room again a few minutes after talking to him about doing his homework. Evan wasn't in his room, and the window was open. Evan had jumped out his window and left a numbered list of reasons to live and die for, then deciding that dying was his solution.

Family

Hart Perry (father) 
Evan's father had a brother who was diagnosed with bipolar depression and committed suicide at the age of 21. Because of this, he did everything he could to prevent the same outcome for his son, Evan Perry. Hart did everything he could to make Evan happy, he would film with him, he would go to therapy with Evan, and he was very supportive. On the day that Evan committed suicide, Hart was the one that found him at the bottom, despite him previously checking in on Evan 5 minutes before, he couldn't stop the outcome.

Dana Perry (mother) 
Evan's mother was equally supportive of Evan, and it was her idea to film everything going on in Evan's life so that therapists would believe her and would have a better idea of what is going on. When Evan was five years old he actually explained to his mother how he was going to commit suicide, very detailed as well. She recorded it and put it in the documentary and it shows Evan climbing onto his bed and showing his mom how he was going to hang himself from the roof of his room. Dana Perry was very caring towards her son and tried everything she could to stop his story from ending so soon.

Nick Perry (brother) 
Nick Perry was Evan's half brother from the dads side of the family. Throughout the documentary, Nick explained how most of the songs Evan wrote were very relatable for someone Nick's age. Nick was more than 5 years older than Evan, so while Evan was 7 years old, writing songs about his inner pain and demons in his head, Nick was in high school and experiencing this. However, there is a certain level of normality when a teenager experiences these thoughts compared to a seven year old. When Evan committed suicide, Nick rushed over to the Perry's house to be there for them. When the suicide note was discovered and Nick read it, he realized that everything Evan was experiencing was common. Evan was scared of failing, he wanted to fit in, and he was insecure. Nick along with every teenager feels this at one point or another, Evan just felt it to a different intensity. Because of this, Nick felt responsible to some degree, he believed that if he had talked to Evan and told him that it was perfectly normal and ok to feel that way then Evan would've been saved.

Production
The film was made by the boy's parents, director Dana Perry and cinematographer Hart Perry. It was made for HBO Documentary Films, being shown on TV and released on DVD. It was also shown at Sundance in January 2009.

Critical response
Variety noted that because of his parents' occupations, they did a good job in recording his life, and produced an "elegiac little gem". The Philadelphia Inquirer called it a "remarkable, deeply unsettling documentary", scoring it 3/4 stars. The Movie Blog criticised the production quality, but found that the film still "communicated effectively and with a lot of emotion". SI Live suggested that the boy's story perhaps did not merit a documentary, but it was "valuable viewing" in that it would educate people a little about mental illness.

Rotten Tomatoes records three positive reviews and no negative.

References

External links
 

2009 films
Documentary films about suicide
HBO documentary films
Films about bipolar disorder
2000s English-language films
2000s American films